The ex Church of Saint Maria del Soccorso is a Catholic Church located in Alcamo, in the province of Trapani. Sicily, Italy.

Description 
Among the most ancient churches in Alcamo, it was probably founded in the 15th century by a merchants from Genoa, who were members of the confraternity dedicated to the cult of the Holy Mary's Rescue. It is situated in corso 6 Aprile, opposite the Mother Church.
Originally it was in Gothic style, with a nave and two aisles, but its form became elliptical during the restoration made in 1739.

The interior is well balanced and full of stuccoes made by Nicolò Curti, brother of Lorenzo Curti who carved the wooden statue of Our Lady of Miracles. On the high altar, there is the 16th-century sculpture of Our Lady of the Rescue (Madonna del Soccorso), realized by Bartolomeo Berrettaro.

In the most popular iconography the Virgin Mary is represented armed with a club while hitting a demon terrified at her feet.

The main portal, carved in white stone, with the impost and architrave with moldings, is surmounted by a lunette assigned to Berrettaro; it represents the image of Our Lady of the Rescue among Angels.

Works 
 Madonna del Soccorso (Our Lady of Perpetual Help): probably a sculpture by Bartolomeo Berrettaro, modified by Giacomo Gagini in 1545: today in the Basilica
 Saint Carlo Borromeo, a 17th-century painting
 Saint Philip Neri, a painting made in 1637 by Francesco Minutilla,  now kept inside the Sacred Art Museum
 The Holy Trinity (Santissima Trinità): a painting realized in 1925 by Francesco Alesi, a priest
 Saint Onuphrius: made also by Francesco Alesi.
 Our Lady of Graces (Madonna delle Grazie), a painting made by Giovan Leonardo Bagolino (Sebastiano Bagolino's father) in 1566. Today it is kept in the chapel of Our Lady of Fátima inside the Basilica.

Madonna del Soccorso 
The cult for this Madonna started in Palermo in 1306, following the apparition to the Augustinian Friar Nicola La Bruna. People say that the monk,  tormented by an incurable disease and very close to death, had been healed thanks to Madonna, who asked him, in return for it, to propagate the news of the miracle and to have her invoked as Our Lady of Perpetual Help.

Thanks to the Augustinian Friars, the veneration for Our Lady of Perpetual Help spread all over Italy. Another title given to her is Our Lady with the Club, because she is represented while brandishing a small club to hit the demon crouched and terrified at her feet.

See also 

 Catholic Church in Italy

Notes

Sources 
 
 
 
 http://www.esperonews.it/20130218289/rubriche/leggende-e-curiosita-del-territorio/caltavuturo-e-gratteri-un-antico-culto-madonita-verso-la-ss-vergine-del-soccorso.html

External links 
 
 
 
 

Roman Catholic churches in Alcamo